Jeremy Dwayne McDaniel is a retired American football player. He played three seasons for the Buffalo Bills from 1998–2001.

Football career
He played for the University of Arizona in his college years. He was picked up by the Buffalo Bills as a free agent. He was traded to San Diego Chargers after a knee injury but never played during a game. From 2003 to 2005, McDaniel played in the Arena Football League for both the Indiana Firebirds and Chicago Rush. He finished his AFL career with 198 catches for 2,309 yards and 41 touchdowns.

Personal
He was born in New Bern, North Carolina. He loved the game of football ever since and looked up to Hall of Fame receiver Lance Alworth. He resides in New Bern where he works as a high school coach at New Bern High. He has a daughter named Journee.

References

1976 births
Living people
Sportspeople from New Bern, North Carolina
American football wide receivers
Arizona Wildcats football players
Buffalo Bills players
Indiana Firebirds players
Chicago Rush players